Alkalimarinus is a Gram-negative genus of bacteria from the class of Alteromonadaceae with one known species (Alkalimarinus sediminis). Alkalimarinus sediminis has been isolated from sediments from the coast of Weihai in China.

References

Alteromonadales
Bacteria genera
Monotypic bacteria genera